The Triple Echo (also known as Soldier in Skirts in its U.S. release) is a 1972 British drama film directed by Michael Apted starring Glenda Jackson, Brian Deacon and Oliver Reed, and based on the 1970 novella by H.E. Bates. It was shot in Wiltshire.

Plot
In England during World War II, Alice, a woman running a farm in the countryside, discovers a young man named Barton roaming the fields. He helps around the farm and the two become friends, then lovers. Barton decides to desert the army. Alice offers him refuge in exchange for help running the farm in the absence of her husband, who has been taken prisoner by the Japanese. Barton puts Alice's ailing dog out of its misery by shooting it with her husband's shotgun.

When the military police begin to search for Barton, he must take measures to avoid being caught, so Alice helps him form the disguise of a woman, whom she says is her sister Jill. However, Barton tells people that his name is Cathy. A sergeant soon begins to take a liking to "Cathy". As Christmas approaches, the sergeant returns to invite Alice and Cathy to a Christmas party. Alice declines, but Barton, wanting to get out and have some fun, accepts the offer. Alice warns him against doing so.

During the party, the sergeant and another soldier take Cathy and a young woman into a back room to have sex, but when Jill forces the sergeant away he realises that Cathy is really a man. Barton escapes, and the military police follow and hunt him near to the farm house where Alice is waiting. Because Alice does not want Barton to suffer at the hands of the soldiers, she shoots him dead with her husband's shotgun.

Cast
 Glenda Jackson as Alice Charlesworth
 Oliver Reed as Sergeant
 Brian Deacon as Barton
 Anthony May as Subaltern
 Gavin Richards as Stan
 Jenny Lee-Wright as Christine
 Kenneth Colley as Provost Corporal
 Daphne Heard as Shopkeeper
 Zelah Clarke as First Girl
 Colin Rix as Compere
 Ioan Meredith as Guard

Production
The film was based on a novella by H.E. Bates, which he started writing in 1968 although he had had the idea since World War Two. The novella was published in 1970. The Guardian said it had "a persistent smell of fabrication right through".

In March 1972 it was announced that the film version would star Glenda Jackson and Oliver Reed, reuniting them after their success in Women in Love. It was an early movie from Hemdale. Director Michael Apted later said the only reason he could make the film "was Glenda was available and was willing to appear for a much smaller than usual fee."

Reception
The Guardian called it "nothing very special... but at least it's a good story, well told." The same paper later said the movie "got some good critical reaction but did nothing at the box office."

In 1973 Jackson said she was "fairly happy" with the film.

Awards
Michael Apted was nominated for a Golden Prize Award at the 8th Moscow International Film Festival in 1973. (The film had been banned from the festival originally but this was lifted after a small cut was made to a sex scene.)

Home media
The film has never been made available on DVD format in the United Kingdom or United States. It was however released in Germany under the title, "Desertiert:Der Kampf ums Überleben", on 1 December 2016 from Medien GmbH distribution. The film has also been released in Spain as "La Máscara y la Piel".

On 10 January 2019, it was announced that The Triple Echo would be made available on Blu-ray from Powerhouse films subsidiary, Indicator. It features a new 2K restoration of the film as well as original Mono audio. A number of new special features are included and limited edition exclusive booklet with the first pressing. The set was released on 25 March 2019.

References

External links 
The Triple Echo Le grand inconnu (fr)
 

1972 films
1972 romantic drama films
1970s war drama films
Adultery in films
British romantic drama films
British war drama films
Cross-dressing in film
Films about farmers
Films based on British novels
Films scored by Marc Wilkinson
Films directed by Michael Apted
Films set in the 1940s
Films shot in Wiltshire
Murder in films
War romance films
British World War II films
1972 directorial debut films
1970s English-language films
1970s British films